Bowerman is an English surname. Notable people with the surname include:

Alfred Bowerman (1873–1959), English cricket player
Bill Bowerman (1911–1999), American track and field coach and co-founder of Nike
C. W. Bowerman (1851–1947), British trade unionist and politician
Cristina Bowerman, Italian chef
Edward LeRoy Bowerman (1892–1977), Canadian politician
Elsie Bowerman (1889–1973), British lawyer, suffragette and Titanic survivor
Frank Bowerman (1868–1948), American baseball player
Fred William Bowerman (1893–1953), American bank robber
Jay Bowerman (1876–1957), American politician
Karen Bowerman, British journalist
Lisa Bowerman (born 1962), British actress
Mary Bowerman (1908–2005), American botanist
Melissa Bowerman (1942–2011), linguist
Ralph Lee Bowerman (1934–2015), American musician
William Bowerman (died 1590), English politician

See also
Bowerman's Nose